Chasing the Sun may refer to:

Arts and literature 
 Chasing the Sun, or Mengejar Matahari, a 2004 Indonesian film
 Chasing the Sun, a book by Richard Cohen
 Chasing the Sun, a book by R. M. Ballantyne
 Chasing the Sun, a book by Juanes
 Chasing the Sun, a book by Tracie Peterson

Music

Albums 
 Chasing the Sun (Ken McIntyre album), 1978
 Chasin' the Sun, a 1991 album by Lionel Cartwright
 Chasing the Sun (Chris Poland album), 2000
 Chasing the Sun (Indigenous album), 2006
 Chasing the Sun (Tara Oram album), 2008
 Chasing the Sun, a 2003 album by Karen Zoid
 Chasing the Sun, a 2005 album by Karan Casey

Songs 
 "Chasing the Sun" (The Wanted song), 2012
 "Chasing the Sun" (Hilary Duff song), 2014
 "Chasing the Sun" (Billy Talent song), 2014
 "Chasing the Sun", a 1982 song by Riders in the Sky from Prairie Serenade
 "Chasing the Sun", a 2003 song by Alex Lloyd from Distant Light
 "Chasing the Sun", a 2004 song by The Calling from Two
 "Chasing the Sun", a 2013 song by Sara Bareilles and Jack Antonoff from The Blessed Unrest
 "Chasing the Sun", a 2021 song by Enrique Iglesias from Final (Vol. 1)

See also 
 Chase the Sun (disambiguation)